Museo Municipal Carmen Funes, or, the Carmen Funes Municipal Museum, is a museum of paleontology in Plaza Huincul, Neuquén Province, Argentina. It is best known for its collection of dinosaur fossils, including the only specimen of the largest recorded dinosaur remains, Argentinosaurus huinculensis, and the only known sauropod embryos, which were discovered at a huge nesting site in Auca Mahuida, Patagonia. Its standard abbreviation is MCF-PVPH, or just PVPH to denote the paleontological collection.

Overview

The founder and director of the museum is the Argentine paleontologist Rodolfo Coria. The museum has an exhibition area, workshops for preparing fossils, and stores. Field work, often in cooperation with American museums, continues in fossil-rich Patagonia. The museum's collections include 11 holotype specimens.

Significant past exhibits include:
 "Tiniest Giants: Discovering Dinosaur Eggs": Features the sauropod eggs and embryoes from Patagonia, in cooperation with the Natural History Museum of Los Angeles County. 
 "Giants of the Mesozoic": Features a mock battle between the largest terrestrial predator known, the Giganotosaurus, and the largest terrestrial animal known, the plant-eating Argentinosaurus. With the Fernbank Museum of Natural History in Atlanta, Georgia.

The museum was established in 1984 with municipal funding, and has become a significant tourist attraction in the province of Neuquén Province. The museum is located at 55 Córdoba Avenue, Plaza Huincul, Neuquén Province (postal code 8318), east of the intersection of National Route 22 and Provincial Route 17.

External links 

 "Carmen Funes Museum". Inter Patagonia. (Spanish version)

Natural history museums in Argentina
Museo Carmen Funes
Museums established in 1984
Museums in Neuquén Province
Dinosaur museums
Museo Carmen Funes